Dongxing may refer to:

People's Republic of China
Dongxing District (东兴区), Neijiang, Sichuan
Dongxing, Guangxi (东兴市), county-level city of Fangchenggang, Guangxi
Dongxing Subdistrict (东兴街道)
Dongxing Subdistrict, Jieyang, in Dongshan District, Jieyang, Guangdong
Dongxing Subdistrict, Wuzhou, in Dieshan District, Wuzhou, Guangxi
Dongxing Subdistrict, Jixi, in Didao District, Jixi, Heilongjiang
Dongxing Subdistrict, Baotou, in Donghe District, Baotou, Inner Mongolia
Dongxing Subdistrict, Baishan, in Hunjiang District, Baishan, Jilin
Dongxing Subdistrict, Benxi, in Mingshan District, Benxi, Liaoning
Dongxing Subdistrict, Liaoyang, in Wensheng District, Liaoyang, Liaoning
Towns named Dongxing (东兴镇)
Dongxing, Dongxing, Guangxi, in Dongxing, Guangxi
Dongxing, Huanjiang County, in Huanjiang Maonan Autonomous County, Guangxi
Dongxing, Mulan County, Heilongjiang
Dongxing, Jingjiang, Jiangsu
Dongxing, Rong County, Sichuan, in Rong County, Sichuan
Dongxing, Maoxian in Mao County, Sichuan
Dongxing Township (东兴乡)
Dongxing Township, Baoqing County, Heilongjiang
Dongxing Township, Lindian County, Heilongjiang
Dongxing Township, Mingshui County, Heilongjiang
Dongxing Township, Jingyu County, Jilin
Dongxing Township, Da County, in Da County, Sichuan
Dongxing Township, Gulin County, in Gulin County, Sichuan
Dongxing Township, Jiangyou, in Jiangyou Sichuan
Dongxing Township, Langzhong, in Langzhong, Sichuan
Dongxing Township, Mao County, in Mao County, Sichuan

Taiwan
Dongxing, Taitung